The United States Air Force's 5th Space Warning Squadron (5 SWS) was a missile warning unit located at Woomera AS, Australia.  It used to be known as the 5th Joint Defense Space Communications Squadron.

Commanders
Col John Harris (1993–1995)
Col Henry W. Poburka (12 Jul 1995-1997)

Decorations
Air Force Outstanding Unit Award 
1 Jan 2000-31 Aug 2001
1 Jan 1999-31 Dec 1999
1 Oct 1995-30 Sep 1997
1 Oct 1992-30 Sep 1994
1 Sep 1989-31 Aug 1991
2 May 1973 – 1 May 1976
17 Nov 1971-1 May 1973

See also
Defense Support Program
2d Space Warning Squadron
8th Space Warning Squadron
11th Space Warning Squadron

References

Space Warning 0005